William Prince (28 March 1868 – 1 June 1948) was an English cricketer who played first-class cricket for Derbyshire in 1898.

Prince was born in Somercotes, Derbyshire, the son of Thomas Prince, a coal miner, and his wife Hannah. In 1881 the family was living at Skegby, Nottingham and Prince himself was a miner at the age of 13.

Prince, with fellow one-timer John Bourne, played one match for Derbyshire in the 1898 season in July against Nottinghamshire. A right-arm medium-fast bowler, Prince was given  little chance to bowl and took no wickets, but conceded just thirteen from nine overs, the best runs-per-over rate for the team during the entire match. He was a right-handed batsman and as a tailender, put on two runs in the first innings and did not bat in the second innings as the match finished as a draw.

Prince died in New Ollerton at the age of 80.

References

1868 births
1948 deaths
English cricketers
Derbyshire cricketers
People from Somercotes
Cricketers from Derbyshire